Tongawali (also spelt as Tangawali and Tangewali) is a 1955 Indian Hindi-language drama film, directed by Lekhraj Bhakri and produced by Kuldip Pictures. The film stars Balraj Sahni, Nirupa Roy, Shammi Kapoor, Anita Guha. It was later remade in Tamil as Alli Petra Pillai (1959).

Cast 
 Balraj Sahni as Laxman
 Nirupa Roy as Rajjo
 Shammi Kapoor
 Anita Guha

Production 
Tonga-wali was produced by Kuldip Pictures and directed by Lekhraj Bhakri. Anita Guha made her acting debut with this film.

Soundtrack 
The music was composed by Salil Chowdhury with lyrics by Bharat Vyas and Prem Dhawan.

References

External links 
 

1950s Hindi-language films
1955 drama films
1955 films
Films scored by Salil Chowdhury
Hindi films remade in other languages
Hindi-language drama films
Indian drama films